The 1987 FIBA Europe Under-16 Championship (known at that time as 1987 European Championship for Cadets) was the 9th edition of the FIBA Europe Under-16 Championship. The cities of Székesfehérvár and Kaposvár, in Hungary, hosted the tournament. Yugoslavia won the trophy for the fifth time. It was its third title in a row and fourth in the last five tournaments.

Teams

Preliminary round
The twelve teams were allocated in two groups of six teams each.

Group A

Group B

Knockout stage

9th–12th playoffs

5th–8th playoffs

Championship

Final standings

Team roster
Živko Badžim, Oliver Popović, Rastko Cvetković, Žan Tabak, Ante Perica, Nenad Grmuša, Boris Orcev, Marijan Kraljević, Obrad Ignjatović, Arijan Komazec, Mirko Pavlović, and Bojan Popović.
Head coach: Janez Drvarič.

References
FIBA Archive
FIBA Europe Archive

FIBA U16 European Championship
1987–88 in European basketball
1987 in Hungarian sport
International youth basketball competitions hosted by Hungary